The Rural Municipality of Kindersley No. 290 is a rural municipality (RM) in the Canadian province of Saskatchewan within Census Division No. 13 and  Division No. 6. It is located in the west-central portion of the province.

History 
The RM of Kindersley No. 290 incorporated as a rural municipality on December 12, 1910.

Geography 
There are several small lakes and steams in the RM. The Teo Lakes in the Verendrye channel are at the centre the Kindersley-Elma (SK 048) Important Bird Area (IBA) of Canada. Over 15,000 geese and 10,000 ducks use the Teo Lakes and surrounding area during the fall migration.

Communities and localities 
The following urban municipalities are surrounded by the RM.

Towns
 Kindersley

Villages
 Brock
 Flaxcombe
 Netherhill

The following unincorporated communities are located in the RM.

Localities
 Fairmount
 Pinkham
 Verendrye

Demographics 

Government 
The RM of Kindersley No. 290 is governed by an elected municipal council and an appointed administrator that meets on the second Tuesday of every month. The reeve of the RM is Glen Harrison while its administrator is Glenda M. Giles. The RM's office is located in Kindersley.

References 

K

Division No. 13, Saskatchewan
Important Bird Areas of Saskatchewan